František Běhounek (1898, Prague - 1973, Karlovy Vary), a Czech radiologist
 3278 Běhounek, a main belt asteroid, named after František Běhounek
 Jiří Běhounek, Czech politician
 Kamil Běhounek, Czech jazz musician

Czech-language surnames